Leoz (Basque: Leotz) is a town and municipality located in the province and autonomous community of Navarre, northern Spain.

References

External links
 Leoz in the Bernardo Estornés Lasa – Auñamendi Encyclopedia (Euskomedia Fundazioa)

Municipalities in Navarre